Voisil is a village in Maritsa Municipality, Plovdiv Province, southern Bulgaria.  the village has 981 inhabitants.

Villages in Maritsa Municipality